Kilindoni  is the capital of Mafia District in Pwani Region, Tanzania. It is the largest settlement on Mafia Island.

Climate 
Mafia island has a tropical climate, and this climate is classified as "Aw" by the Köppen-Geiger system. Average temperature in town of Kilindoni is 26.7 °C (78 °F). The average annual rainfall is 1,705 mm. The monthly average temperatures are usually between 24.8 - 28.3 °C (77 °F - 83 °F). There is one major rain season, with most rainfall coming between March and May. Dry season spans between July to October.

Economy 
The economy is based on fishing, subsistence agriculture and the market in Kilindoni. The island attracts some tourists, mainly adventure scuba divers, game fishermen, and people wanting relaxation.

Airport 
The island can be reached from Dar es Salaam by flights operated by Auric Air. This is the only airport on the island.

References

Mafia Island
Populated places in Pwani Region